"You've Got a Friend" is a song written and produced by Stock Aitken Waterman and performed by Sonia and Big Fun, and featuring Gary Barnacle on sax. The song, a midtempo pop ballad, was released as a charity single for the Childline foundation on June 11, 1990. Initially the artists recorded the well-known Carole King song of the same name, but for reasons unknown it was ultimately not used and SAW wrote an original song with the same name instead. The cover version was finally released in the 2010 re-issue of Big Fun's album, A Pocketful of Dreams.

The single peaked at number 14 in the UK and number 12 in Ireland. It was later included on Big Fun's Japanese edition of their debut album A Pocketful of Dreams.

Track listings
CD single
 "You've Got a Friend" - 3:33
 "You've Got a Friend" (Extended Mix) - 6:30
 "You've Got a Friend" (Extended Instrumental) - 6:30
7-inch single
 "You've Got a Friend" - 3:33
 "You've Got a Friend" (Instrumental) - 3:33
12-inch single
 "You've Got a Friend" (Extended Mix) - 6:30
 "You've Got a Friend" (Extended Instrumental) - 6:30

Charts

References

1990 singles
Sonia (singer) songs
Song recordings produced by Stock Aitken Waterman
1990 songs
Chrysalis Records singles
1990s ballads
Songs written by Mike Stock (musician)
Songs written by Matt Aitken
Songs written by Pete Waterman
Big Fun (band) songs
Pop ballads
Vocal collaborations